Fred Calvin "Hack" Spencer (April 25, 1885 – February 5, 1969) was an American professional baseball player. Spencer played for the St. Louis Browns in the 1912 season. In one career game, he pitched in 1.2 innings and gave up two hits and two runs. He batted and threw right-handed.

Spencer was born in St. Cloud, Minnesota, and died in St. Anthony, Minnesota.

External links
Baseball Reference.com page

1885 births
1969 deaths
St. Louis Browns players
Sportspeople from St. Cloud, Minnesota
Baseball players from Minnesota
Baseball pitchers
Keokuk Indians players
Burlington Pathfinders players
Hannibal Cannibals players
Quincy Old Soldiers players